Jørgen Ravn (9 January 1884 – 1 December 1962) was a Danish gymnast. He competed in the men's team, Swedish system event at the 1912 Summer Olympics, winning a silver medal.

References

External links
 

1884 births
1962 deaths
Danish male artistic gymnasts
Olympic gymnasts of Denmark
Gymnasts at the 1912 Summer Olympics
People from Guldborgsund Municipality
Olympic silver medalists for Denmark
Olympic medalists in gymnastics
Medalists at the 1912 Summer Olympics
Sportspeople from Region Zealand